Ho Chi Minh City Football Club (HCMC FC), simply known as TP Hồ Chí Minh, and commonly known as TPHCM, is a professional football club based in Ho Chi Minh City, Vietnam. The club competes in the V.League 1, the highest level of Vietnamese football, since the 2017 season after winning the Vietnam's second tier league in the 2016 season. The club was formerly known as Cảng Sài Gòn. The club's home ground is the Thống Nhất Stadium.

History
The club was founded in 1960 as the name Tong Nha Thuong Cang. This club had a long-standing rivalry with Hải Quan F.C. (Saigon Customs FC).
Throughout history, the club has undergone a number of name changes due to ownership and various sponsorship agreements.
1960–1975 = Tong Nha Thuong Cang FC (đội bóng đá Tống Nha Thương Cảng)
1975–2000 = Saigon Port Workers FC (đội bóng đá công nhân Cảng Sài Gòn)
2001–2003 = Saigon Port FC (Cảng Sài Gòn)
2004–2008 = Southern Steel – Saigon Port FC (Thép Miền Nam – Cảng Sài Gòn)
2009–present = Hồ Chí Minh City FC (CLB bóng đá TP Hồ Chí Minh)

Players

First-team squad
As of 17 January 2023

Out on loan

Reserves and academy

Honours

National competitions
League
V.League 1/South Vietnam Nation League:
Winners(5): 1977, 1986, 1993–94, 1997, 2001–02
 Runners-up: 2019
Third place: 1985, 1990, 1995
V.League 2:
 Winners: 2004, 2016
 Third place: 2015
Cup
Vietnamese Cup:
 Winners: 1992, 1999–2000
 Runners-up: 1994, 1996, 1997
 Third place: 2020, 2019
Vietnamese Super Cup:
 Runners-up: 2000, 2002, 2019

Other competitions
BTV Cup:
 Winners: 2000
 Runners-up: 2001

Season-by-season records

Continental record
All results list Ho Chi Minh City's goal tally first.

Kit suppliers and shirt sponsors

Performance in AFC competitions
AFC Champions League: 2 appearances
 2002–03: Qualification round 3
 2020: Preliminary round 2
AFC Cup: 1 appearance
 2020: Group stage

Notes

References

External links
Official website 
Soccerway profile
V.League profile 

Football clubs in Vietnam
Football clubs in Ho Chi Minh City
Association football clubs established in 1975
Works association football clubs in Vietnam
Ho Chi Minh City FC